"Girls (All Around the World)" is a song by British-Australian recording artist Reece Mastin. It was released as a digital download on 25 October 2013. The song peaked at number 59 on the ARIA Singles Chart. "Girls (All Around the World)" was written by Mastin, Rune Westberg, Brian Howes and was produced by Rune Westberg.

Music video
A music video to accompany the release of "Girls (All Around the World)" was first released onto YouTube on 24 October 2013 at a total length of three minutes and nineteen seconds.

Track listing

Chart performance

Release history

References

2013 singles
Reece Mastin songs
Songs written by Rune Westberg
Songs written by Brian Howes
2013 songs
Sony Music Australia singles